Edward Ling (born 7 March 1983) is an English sport shooter who represented Great Britain at the 2004 Summer Olympics,  2012 Summer Olympics, and 2016 Summer Olympics. Ling was born in Taunton, Somerset.

At the 2004 Summer Olympics in Athens he participated in the men's trap event, finishing tied for 25th position.  In 2012, he also competed in the men's trap, finishing in 21st position. At the 2016 Summer Olympics, he won the bronze medal in the men's trap.

Personal life

He is a crop farmer in Somerset, and also works as a shooting coach. He is married to Abbey Burton, a fellow professional shooter, and has one daughter with her.

References

1983 births
Living people
British male sport shooters
Trap and double trap shooters
Olympic shooters of Great Britain
Shooters at the 2004 Summer Olympics
Shooters at the 2012 Summer Olympics
Shooters at the 2016 Summer Olympics
European Games competitors for Great Britain
Shooters at the 2015 European Games
Olympic medalists in shooting
Medalists at the 2016 Summer Olympics
Olympic bronze medallists for Great Britain
British people of Chinese descent
People from Taunton